Nizhny Chiryurt is a rural locality (a selo) in Kizilyurtovsky District, Republic of Dagestan, Russia. The population was 1,509 as of 2010. There are 58 streets.

Geography 
Nizhny Chiryurt is located 6 km south of Kizilyurt (the district's administrative centre) by road, on the Sulak River. Stary Bavtugay and Bavtugay are the nearest rural localities.

Nationalities 
Avars live there.

References 

Rural localities in Kizilyurtovsky District